Kuala Dungun is a mukim and the capital of Dungun District, Terengganu, Malaysia. It is situated midway between Tanjung Jara and Paka.

References

Dungun District
Mukims of Terengganu